Kannugudi East is a village in the Orathanadu taluk of Thanjavur district, Tamil Nadu, India.

Demographics 

As per census, Kannugudi East had a total population of 1,785 with 873 males and 912 females. The sex ratio was 1.045. The literacy rate was 70.82%.
Kannugudi is the one of the most beautiful village in thanjavur district, Large part of the people involved in agriculture, one famous temple is there in kannugudi north street which is kali amman temple.

References 

 

Villages in Thanjavur district